Yulia Yushekivitch  (born 14 September 1980) is a Russian former footballer who played as a defender for the Russia women's national football team. She was part of the team at the 1999 FIFA Women's World Cup.

References

External links
 

1980 births
Living people
Russian women's footballers
Russia women's international footballers
Place of birth missing (living people)
1999 FIFA Women's World Cup players
Women's association football defenders
WFC Rossiyanka players
Ryazan-VDV players